Willie D. "Hutch" Jones (born September 1, 1959) is an American former professional basketball player. He played in the National Basketball Association for the San Diego Clippers for several games at the starts of both the 1982–83 and 1983–84 seasons before embarking on a seven-year career in Spain and Italy. Jones also played briefly in the Continental Basketball Association over the 1982–83 and 1983–84 seasons, for the Las Vegas/Albuquerque Silvers and for the Wyoming Wildcatters.

References

1959 births
Living people
Albuquerque Silvers players
American expatriate basketball people in Italy
American expatriate basketball people in Spain
American men's basketball players
Basketball players from Buffalo, New York
Buffalo State Bengals men's basketball players
CB Girona players
CB Gran Canaria players
Las Vegas Silvers players
Liga ACB players
Los Angeles Lakers draft picks
RCD Espanyol Bàsquet players
San Diego Clippers players
Small forwards
Vanderbilt Commodores men's basketball players
Wyoming Wildcatters players